Qué perra vida (What a Dog Life) is a 1962 Mexican comedy film written and directed by Jaime Salvador, starring the double act Viruta y Capulina, performed by Marco Antonio Campos and Gaspar Henaine. Co-starring are Norma Mora, Magda Urvizu, and Rayo. The film was produced by Filmadora Chapultepec.

Cast
Marco Antonio Campos as Viruta (credited as Viruta)
Gaspar Henaine as Capulina (credited as Capulina)
Norma Mora as Marta
Magda Urvizu as Ofelia
Rayo as Rayo
Omar Jasso as Comisario Artemio Lozano
Yerye Beirute as Gaspar Toloso
Manuel Arvide as Attorney Rómulo Monzón
Arturo Castro 'Bigotón' as Abarrotero (as Arturo 'Bigotón' Castro)
Lupe Carriles as Esposa de Gaspar
Alberto Catalá as Policía
Edmundo Espino as Don Abelardo
Chel López	as Drunkard in jail (uncredited)

External links

1962 comedy films
1962 films
Films directed by Jaime Salvador
Mexican black-and-white films
Mexican comedy films
1960s Mexican films